Sam C. Ranelli (February 21, 1920 – December 30, 1999) was a professional big band jazz drummer from Birmingham, Alabama.  Ranelli played with several famous big bands and eventually formed and lead his own big band.  In 1982, he was inducted into the Alabama Jazz Hall of Fame.

References

American jazz drummers
1920 births
1999 deaths
20th-century American drummers
American male drummers
20th-century American male musicians
American male jazz musicians